Connie Petracek (born December 25, 1947) is an American sports shooter. She competed at the 1992 Summer Olympics and the 1996 Summer Olympics.

References

External links
 

1947 births
Living people
American female sport shooters
Olympic shooters of the United States
Shooters at the 1992 Summer Olympics
Shooters at the 1996 Summer Olympics
People from Chambersburg, Pennsylvania
Pan American Games medalists in shooting
Pan American Games gold medalists for the United States
Pan American Games silver medalists for the United States
Shooters at the 1991 Pan American Games
Shooters at the 1995 Pan American Games
Medalists at the 1991 Pan American Games
Medalists at the 1995 Pan American Games
21st-century American women